Shades is an American R&B group that was active in the mid 1990s. The group consisted of Danielle Andrews, Tiffanie Cardwell, Monique Peoples and Shannon Walker Williams; who all met when they were students at Northeastern University in Boston, Massachusetts.

The group released their eponymous debut album in 1997 on Motown Records. The most successful single from the album was the lead single "Tell Me (I'll Be Around)", which peaked at #50 on the Billboard Hot 100. They reunited in 2019 and released a new single “This Ain’t Love”.

Discography

Albums
 Shades (1997)

Singles

References

External links
Official Instagram

American contemporary R&B musical groups
Motown artists
African-American girl groups
Musical groups established in 1996
Musical groups from Boston